Nassandres sur Risle (literally Nassandres on Risle) is a commune in the department of Eure, northern France. The municipality was established on 1 January 2017 by merger of the former communes of Nassandres (the seat), Carsix, Fontaine-la-Soret and Perriers-la-Campagne.

Population

See also 
Communes of the Eure department

References 

Communes of Eure